Madansingh Parmar (born 20 August 1936) is an Indian former cricketer. He played first-class cricket for several domestic teams in India between 1956 and 1970.

See also
 List of Bengal cricketers

References

External links
 

1936 births
Living people
Indian cricketers
Baroda cricketers
Bengal cricketers
Railways cricketers
Saurashtra cricketers
People from Banaskantha district